The Rose Island Light, built in 1870, is on Rose Island in Narragansett Bay in Newport, Rhode Island in the United States. It is preserved, maintained and operated by The Rose Island Lighthouse Foundation.

One of a group of New England lighthouses built to an award-winning design by Vermont architect Albert Dow, Rose Island Light has sisters at Sabin Point, Pomham Rocks, Esopus Meadows Light and Colchester Reef. The lighthouse stands atop a bastion of Fort Hamilton, which was built in 1798-1800.

The building was abandoned as a functioning lighthouse in 1970, when the Newport Bridge was constructed nearby. In 1984, the Rose Island Lighthouse Foundation was founded to restore the dilapidated light on behalf of the City of Newport, which had received it for free from the United States government.  In 1987, the federal government listed the lighthouse on the National Register of Historic Places. In 1992 it was relit as a private aid to navigation.

The lighthouse is today a travel destination, reached only by boat. For a fee to the Foundation, visitors can spend a night as a guest or a week as the "lighthouse keeper," completing many of the chores required to keep the lighthouse in good condition.

See also
National Register of Historic Places listings in Newport County, Rhode Island

References

External links
Rose Island Lighthouse Foundation

Lighthouses in Newport County, Rhode Island
Buildings and structures in Newport, Rhode Island
Narragansett Bay
Lighthouses completed in 1870
Historic district contributing properties in Rhode Island
Lighthouses on the National Register of Historic Places in Rhode Island
National Register of Historic Places in Newport, Rhode Island
Historic American Engineering Record in Rhode Island
Tourist attractions in Newport, Rhode Island
1870 establishments in Rhode Island